The Black Room (released in Great Britain as The Black Room Mystery) is a 1935 American horror film directed by Roy William Neill (as R. William Neill) and starring Boris Karloff. Cinematography was done by Allen G. Siegler.

Plot
In a Tyrolean castle in the late 18th century, twin sons, Gregor and Anton, are born to the de Berghmann baronial family. The baron is concerned: an old prophecy in the family states that the younger brother shall kill the elder in the Black Room of the castle.

Some years later in 1834, it is revealed that the Baron Gregor (Boris Karloff) has become a depraved ruler who murders the wives of local peasants. His brother, Anton (also played by Karloff), who cannot use his right arm and has spent much of his life traveling Europe, returns to the castle for a visit, but refuses to believe the rumors he hears about Gregor. The kindly Anton becomes popular with the villagers and the castle staff, being the exact opposite of his brother.  At the same time, Gregor's attempts to woo Thea (Marian Marsh), daughter of family advisor
Colonel Hassell, fail noticeably before both her admiration for Anton and her true love for young Lieutenant Albert Lussan (Robert Allen).

When the castle servant Mashka (Katherine DeMille) disappears after being seen with Gregor, the locals form a mob and enter the castle, confronting the baron. Gregor agrees to abdicate, and give power to his brother, who has become popular.  After the papers are signed to relinquish his baronetcy to Anton, he lures his unsuspecting brother to the Black Room, kills him, and throws him into the pit where the dead bodies of Mashka and his other victims are kept. Gregor now assumes Anton's identity, and prepares to wed Thea, whose father supports their union. Lt. Lussan angrily and threateningly objects to the Colonel; Gregor kills the Colonel when a game of chess and his signing of a document reflected in a mirror both expose him, and then easily frames the Lieutenant, who is found guilty and sentenced to death.

Following this, only Anton's mastiff recognizes that the baron is not his master, and the dog pursues Gregor when he travels to town for his wedding. Meanwhile, Lussan escapes his cell and meets secretly with Thea, who urges him to flee. He refuses, however, and the wedding ceremony begins in the town cathedral. As the stately ceremony draws to a close, the priest asks for any who object to the union to "speak now or forever hold their peace", and the dog attacks "Anton", who defends himself with his supposedly paralyzed right arm. Standing thus revealed, Gregor flees. The townspeople gathered for the wedding form a mob in a matter of seconds. The dog, followed by the mob, which includes Lussan, pursues Gregor to the castle, where he attempts to hide in the Black Room.  The mob discovers where he is and begins to batter open the secret door.  Before they can gain passage, however, the dog squeezes through and throws himself on Gregor, who falls backward into the pit and onto the knife still held in his murdered brother's hand. Thus, the prophecy is fulfilled.

Cast
 Boris Karloff as Baron Gregor de Berghmann / Anton de Berghmann
 Marian Marsh as Thea Hassel
 Robert Allen as Lt. Albert Lussan
 Thurston Hall as Col. Paul Hassel
 Katherine DeMille as Maska (as Katherine De Mille)
 John Buckler as Buran
 Henry Kolker as Baron de Bergman
 Colin Tapley as Lt. Paul Hassel 
 Torben Meyer as Peter

Response
Writing for The Spectator in 1935, Graham Greene described the film as "absurd and exciting", and "wildly artificial." Greene praised both the acting of Karloff and the direction of Neill, noting that Karloff had been given a long speaking part and "allowed to act at last", and that Neill had "caught the genuine Gothic note" in a manner that displayed more historical sense than any of Alexander Korda's films. Author and film critic Leonard Maltin awarded the film three out of four stars, calling it "[an] Excellent, understated thriller". Maltin also praised Karloff's performance as one of the actor's best.

From retrospective reviews, Tony Rayns reviewed the film in Sight & Sound, finding The Black Room as having "obvious aspirations to be a Paramount movie" noting its setting and "lavish deployment of crowds of extras". Rayns found that Karloff appeared to be relishing his dual role and that he "makes the most of some Hays Code defying hints of blasphemy."

See also
 List of American films of 1935
 Boris Karloff filmography

References

Sources

External links

 
 
 
Joe Dante on The Black Room at Trailers from Hell

American horror thriller films
American historical horror films
1930s historical films
1930s horror thriller films
1935 horror films
1935 films
American black-and-white films
Columbia Pictures films
Films directed by Roy William Neill
Films about twin brothers
Films set in Austria
Films set in castles
Films set in 1834
Films scored by Louis Silvers
Films produced by Robert North
American serial killer films
Twins in fiction
Films set in the Austrian Empire
1930s English-language films
1930s American films